Sir Ian Edward Lamert Davis (born 10 March 1951) is an English businessman, best known for his role as managing director of McKinsey & Company. He succeeded Rajat Gupta on 1 July 2003. He joined McKinsey in 1979  retired in 2010, after 7 years at Bowater and currently serves as a senior partner emeritus.

Davis was born in Kent, England. Prior to becoming managing director, he was office manager of McKinsey's London and UK office. He has an undergraduate degree in Philosophy, Politics and Economics from Balliol College, University of Oxford. He is a member of the board of BP.

He is the brother of former Reed Elsevier chairman Crispin Davis. His twin brother is Sir Nigel Davis, a Court of Appeal judge.

Davis is a Non-Executive Director at Johnson & Johnson, BP, Teach For All, Big Society Trust and Majid Al Futtaim Group.  He is a Senior Adviser to Apax Partners, a Non-Executive Board Member at the UK Cabinet Office and an Advisory Director of King Abdullah Petroleum Studies and Research Centre.

He is currently chairman of Rolls-Royce Holdings.

Davis was knighted in the 2019 Birthday Honours for services to business.

Memberships 
 Non-executive Director of Xlinks
 Non-executive Director BP since 2 April 2010
 Independent Non-Executive Director Johnson & Johnson
 Non-Executive Director Majid Al Futtaim Group
 Non-Executive Director Mubadala
 Non-Executive Director Teach For All
 Non-Executive Director Big Society Trust
 Non-Executive Member of Cabinet Office
 Senior Adviser to McKinsey & Company
 Senior Adviser to Apax Partners
 Advisory Director to King Abdullah Petroleum Study and Research Centre
 International Business Council of the World Economic Forum
 Conference Board, member Board of Trustees
 Cambridge Judge Business School, University of Cambridge, Advisory Board member
 City of Beijing, Advisory Board member

References 

People from Kent
Alumni of Balliol College, Oxford
McKinsey & Company people
1951 births
Living people
Directors of BP
English chief executives
British corporate directors
Knights Bachelor
Businesspeople awarded knighthoods